Tess of the Storm Country is a 1960 American drama film directed by Paul Guilfoyle, written by Charles Lang and starring Diane Baker, Jack Ging, Lee Philips, Archie Duncan, Nancy Valentine and Bert Remsen. It is based on the novel with the same title by Grace Miller White and its adaptation for the stage by Rupert Hughes. The film was released on December 8, 1960 by 20th Century-Fox.

Plot
The move starts with small rural town in. Pennsylvania where a feud simmers between farmer Fred Thorson and the Graveses, the Mennonite family who sold their mill to the Foley chemical company that is now contaminating the river with toxic wastes. Tess MacLean accompanied by her uncle Capt. Hamish MacLean arrives from Scotland to marry John Faulkner. Tragedy strikes when Tess arrives in Pennsylvania and is told that her fiancée is dead. This starts a series of events that are the main plot of the novel. Peter Graves a member of the town hurries to tell Tess that his family did not kill Faulkner, however Eric Thorson a member of the rival family and a close friend of John tells Tess that Peter's dad killed John. Tess also learns that John has left his farm to her, so she starts a new life on the farm. However, due to the poisoned water the farm starts dying. When one of the newborn calves dies from poisoning on Tess's farm, she lashes out at Peter telling him to close down the mill. Realizing that they can drive the mill out of business with a dam, Eric's father Fred petitions the Graves to build a dam, but they refuse because only the government can petition a dam. After all this the Graveses invite the MacLeans to dinner, where Tess comments on the strange Mennonite customs. However dinner comes to an end when Fred arrives and says his prize Angus steer has fallen ill and vows vengeance if the animal dies. Eric goes to ask Foley to shut down the mill, and when refused gets drunk. While drunk he kisses Tess who retaliates for he is being too forward. In a day after this Tess rides her bike to the river that crosses the Graveses land. When a bull attacks her Peter saves her. Tess kisses him and admits she respects him. After Fred's bull dies he and Captain McLean plot to blow up the plant. Tess arrives at the plant just after Fred plants the bomb and it explodes. The guards only seeing Tess thinks that she blew up the plant, but Peter helps her into a boat and accepts responsibility for blowing up the plant. After Peter is arrested, Tess visits him in prison and says he is the most wonderful man she knows and kisses him. Then Eric, Captain MacLean, and Foley arrive where Foley lies and says the exploded due to a faulty faulty steam boiler, freeing Peter. Once Freed Peter asks MacLean for Tess's hand in marriage, he consents but refuses to attend the wedding when he learns it will be held in a Mennonite church and Tess will like a life of a Mennonite wife. As Tess and Peter repeat their vows, MacLean and Fred peer through the church window. When the newlyweds go outside, MacLean meets them and gives his blessing.

Cast 
Diane Baker as Tess MacLean
Jack Ging as Peter Graves
Lee Philips as Eric Thorson
Archie Duncan as Hamish MacLean
Nancy Valentine as Teola Graves
Bert Remsen as Mike Foley
Wallace Ford as Fred Thorson
Grandon Rhodes as Mr. Foley
Robert F. Simon as Mr. Graves

Production
The film was produced by Robert L. Lippert's outfit Associated Producers Inc.

In August 1960, Millie Perkins was suspended by 20th Century-Fox for refusing to play the lead, and Diane Baker took the role.

References

External links 
 

Tess of the Storm Country at BFI

1960 films
Films based on American novels
Films based on works by Grace Miller White
Films based on works by Rupert Hughes
20th Century Fox films
American drama films
CinemaScope films
1960 drama films
Films with screenplays by Rupert Hughes
Films scored by Paul Sawtell
1960s English-language films
Films directed by Paul Guilfoyle
1960s American films